Knud Johan Victor Rasmussen (7 June 1879 – 21 December 1933) was a Greenlandic–Danish polar explorer and anthropologist. He has been called the "father of Eskimology" (now often known as Inuit Studies or Greenlandic and Arctic Studies) and was the first European to cross the Northwest Passage via dog sled. He remains well known in Greenland, Denmark and among Canadian Inuit.

Early years

Rasmussen was born in Jakobshavn, Greenland, the son of a Danish missionary, the vicar Christian Rasmussen, and an Inuit–Danish mother, Lovise Rasmussen (née Fleischer). He had two siblings.

Rasmussen spent his early years in Greenland among the Kalaallit where he learned to speak Kalaallisut, hunt, drive dog sleds and live in harsh Arctic conditions. "My playmates were native Greenlanders; from the earliest boyhood I played and worked with the hunters, so even the hardships of the most strenuous sledge-trips became pleasant routine for me."

He was later educated in Lynge, North Zealand, Denmark. Between 1898 and 1900 he pursued an unsuccessful career as an actor and opera singer.

Career

He went on his first expedition in 1902–1904, known as The Danish Literary Expedition, with Jørgen Brønlund, Harald Moltke and Ludvig Mylius-Erichsen, to examine Inuit culture. After returning home he went on a lecture circuit and wrote The People of the Polar North (1908), a combination travel journal and scholarly account of Inuit folklore. In 1908, he married Dagmar Andersen.

In 1910, Rasmussen and friend Peter Freuchen established the Thule Trading Station at Cape York (Qaanaaq), Greenland, as a trading base. The name Thule was chosen because it was the most northerly trading post in the world, literally the "Ultima Thule". Thule Trading Station became the home base for a series of seven expeditions, known as the Thule Expeditions, between 1912 and 1933.

The Thule expeditions
The First Thule Expedition (1912, Rasmussen and Freuchen) aimed to test Robert Peary's claim that a channel divided Peary Land from Greenland. They proved this was not the case in a remarkable  journey across the inland ice that almost killed them. Clements Markham, president of the Royal Geographical Society, called the journey the "finest ever performed by dogs." Freuchen wrote personal accounts of this journey (and others) in Vagrant Viking (1953) and I Sailed with Rasmussen (1958). In 1915, he translated Mathias Storch's novel  into Danish (The Dream in English; translated as ), the first novel written in Greenlandic.

The Second Thule Expedition (1916–1918) was larger with a team of seven men, which set out to map a little-known area of Greenland's north coast. This journey was documented in Rasmussen's account Greenland by the Polar Sea (1921). The trip was beset with two fatalities, the only in Rasmussen's career, namely Thorild Wulff and Hendrik Olsen. The Third Thule Expedition (1919) was depot-laying for Roald Amundsen's polar drift in the ship Maud. The Fourth Thule Expedition (1919–1920) was in east Greenland where Rasmussen spent several months collecting ethnographic data near Angmagssalik.

Rasmussen's "greatest achievement" was the massive Fifth Thule Expedition (1921–1924) which was designed to "attack the great primary problem of the origin of the Eskimo race." A ten volume account (The Fifth Thule Expedition 1921–1924 (1946)) of ethnographic, archaeological and biological data was collected, and many artifacts are still on display in museums in Denmark. The team of seven first went to eastern Arctic Canada where they began collecting specimens, taking interviews (including the shaman Aua, who told him of Uvavnuk), and excavating sites.

Rasmussen left the team and traveled for 16 months with two Inuit hunters by dog sled across North America to Nome, Alaska – he tried to continue to Russia but his visa was refused. He was the first European to cross the Northwest Passage via dog sled. His journey is recounted in Across Arctic America (1927), considered today a classic of polar expedition literature. This trip has also been called the "Great Sled Journey" and was dramatized in the Canadian film The Journals of Knud Rasmussen (2006).

For the next seven years Rasmussen traveled between Greenland and Denmark giving lectures and writing. In 1931, he went on the Sixth Thule Expedition, designed to consolidate Denmark's claim on a portion of eastern Greenland that was contested by Norway.

The Seventh Thule Expedition (1933) was meant to continue the work of the sixth, but Rasmussen contracted pneumonia after an episode of food poisoning attributed to eating kiviaq, dying a few weeks later in Copenhagen at the age of 54. During this expedition Rasmussen worked on the film The Wedding of Palo, which Rasmussen wrote the screenplay for. The film was directed by Friedrich Dalsheim and completed in 1934 under the Danish title Palos brudefærd.

Honors

In addition to several capes and glaciers, Knud Rasmussen Range in Greenland is named after him.

He was awarded an Honorary Fellowship from the American Geographical Society in 1912, and its Daly Medal in 1924. The Royal Geographical Society awarded him their Founder's Medal in 1923 and the Royal Danish Geographical Society their Hans Egede Medal in 1924. He was made honorary doctor at the University of Copenhagen in 1924, and the University of St Andrews in 1927.

Bibliography
 The People of the Polar North (1908)
 Greenland by the Polar Sea: The Story of the Thule Expedition from Melville Bay to Cape Morris Jesup (1921) 
 Eskimo Folk Tales (1921)
 Across Arctic America: Narrative of the Fifth Thule Expedition (1927)
 The Fifth Thule Expedition (1946–52) 10 volumes

Notes

Further reading
 Bown, Stephen R. White Eskimo: Knud Rasmussen's Fearless Journey into the Heart of the Arctic (Da Capo, 2015). xxvi, 341 pp. 
 Cruwys, Elizabeth (2003). "Rasmussen, Knud (1879–1933)", in Literature of Travel and Exploration: An Encyclopedia, volume 3. 
 Malaurie, Jean (1982). The Last Kings of Thule: With the Polar Eskimos, as They Face Their Destiny, trans. Adrienne Folk.
 Markham, Clements R. (1921). The Lands of Silence: A History of Arctic and Antarctic Exploration. Cambridge University Press.

External links 

 Biography of Knud Rasmussen on Inuit.uqam.ca

 
 
 
 
 
 Aviation Studies in Greenland Report by Knud Rasmussen et al. at Dartmouth College Library

1879 births
1933 deaths
Burials at Vestre Cemetery, Copenhagen
Danish ethnologists
Explorers of the Arctic
Explorers of Alaska
Explorers of Canada
Greenlandic Inuit people
Greenlandic people of Danish descent
Greenlandic polar explorers
People from Ilulissat
People from Hundested
Exploration of the Arctic
Eskimologists